Lava Hot Springs is a city along the Portneuf River in eastern Bannock County, Idaho, United States. It is part of the Pocatello, Idaho metropolitan area. The population was 407 at the 2010 census, down from 521 in 2000. Located in the mountainous valley of the Portneuf River on the old route of the Oregon Trail and California Trail, the city has become a popular resort location, noted for its numerous hot springs amenable to bathing and a turbulent inner tube run through part of the town.

Geography

Demographics

2010 census
At the 2010 census there were 407 people in 209 households, including 104 families, in the city. The racial makeup of the city was 97.5% White, 0.2% African American, 0.2% Native American, 1.2% from other races, and 0.7% from two or more races. Hispanic or Latino of any race were 4.2%.

Of the 209 households 16.3% had children under the age of 18 living with them, 40.2% were married couples living together, 8.1% had a female householder with no husband present, 1.4% had a male householder with no wife present, and 50.2% were non-families. 44.5% of households were one person and 20.6% were one person aged 65 or older. The average household size was 1.95 and the average family size was 2.74.

The median age was 50.9 years. 16.7% of residents were under the age of 18; 6.2% were between the ages of 18 and 24; 19.2% were from 25 to 44; 31.4% were from 45 to 64; and 26.5% were 65 or older. The gender makeup of the city was 48.2% male and 51.8% female.

2000 census
At the 2000 census there were 521 people in 232 households, including 125 families, in the city. The racial makeup of the city was 96.93% White, 1.15% Native American, 0.19% Asian, 1.34% from other races, and 0.38% from two or more races. Hispanic or Latino of any race were 2.30%.

Of the 232 households 24.1% had children under the age of 18 living with them, 41.8% were married couples living together, 7.8% had a female householder with no husband present, and 45.7% were non-families. 39.7% of households were one person and 19.0% were one person aged 65 or older. The average household size was 2.23 and the average family size was 3.06.

The age distribution was 27.4% under the age of 18, 5.2% from 18 to 24, 26.7% from 25 to 44, 21.9% from 45 to 64, and 18.8% 65 or older. The median age was 40 years. For every 100 females, there were 98.9 males. For every 100 females age 18 and over, there were 97.9 males.

The median household income was $23,472 and the median family income was $38,750. Males had a median income of $38,125 versus $20,313 for females. The per capita income for the city was $16,242. About 16.7% of families and 25.1% of the population were below the poverty line, including 33.6% of those under age 18 and 10.5% of those age 65 or over.

Transportation

The primary road through the city is U.S. Route 30 (US 30), which passes just north of the majority of the community. On the northeast corner of the city is the western end of Old Highway 30, which is a former routing of US 30 that runs parallel to and just south of the Union Pacific Railroad (UP) tracks (formerly Oregon Short Line) around the north end of the Fish Creek Range.

Notable people
 Terrel Bell (1921–1996), 2nd United States Secretary of Education (1981–1984)
 Kevin Andrus, member of the Idaho House of Representatives

See also

 List of cities in Idaho
 Lava Hot Springs (thermal mineral springs)

References

External links

 Lava Hot Springs Chamber of Commerce
 Official Southeast Idaho travel guide

Cities in Idaho
Pocatello, Idaho metropolitan area
Cities in Bannock County, Idaho